Topchi may refer to:

 Topchi or Tupchi, Afghanistan, a village in Bamyan Province of Afghanistan
 Topchi or Tupchi, Iran, a village in East Azerbaijan Province, Iran
 Topchi or Topçu, Ismailli, Topchu, and Torchu,  a village and municipality in the Ismailli Rayon of Azerbaijan

See also 
 Topçu (disambiguation)